Dustin is the leading re-seller of IT-products and additional services in the Nordics. Founded in 1984, by Bo Lundevall and his wife Ulla Lundevall in a zoo-shop in Farsta, Stockholm. Dustin started off selling colored floppy disks over  mail order and started selling IT and technology products over the Internet in 1995. The company employed more than 1000 persons and had revenue of approx 9.3 billion Swedish kronor SEK in 2016/17.
Dustin was acquired by the private equity company Altor Equity Partners in 2006.

In 2004 Dustin home was founded, which specializes in selling products to home users.

In 2007 Dustin acquired the Danish companies TCM  and Computerstore A/S. In 2012 Dustin acquired IT-Hantverkarna and Best Office in Sweden and Norsk Data Senter in Norway. In 2013 Dustin acquired Businessforum in Finland. In 2015 Dustin Group was listed on Nasdaq Stockholm. In 2022 Dustin acquired Centralpoint in the Netherlands.

Sources

External links
  

Online retailers of Sweden
Retail companies established in 1984
Companies based in Stockholm County